Pseudophaloe xiphydria is a moth in the family Erebidae. It was described by Hans Zerny in 1928. It is found in Colombia.

References

Moths described in 1928
Pseudophaloe